Atimpoku is a small town in the Eastern Region of Ghana and located along the Volta River. It is the capital of the Asuogyaman District, a district in the Eastern Region of Ghana.

Geography

The town of Atimpoku is located on the banks of the Volta River, which drains south to the Gulf of Guinea, and is the location of the Adomi Bridge (originally the Volta Bridge), Ghana's longest suspension bridge and the first permanent bridge to span the Volta River.  The town is about 2.5 miles downstream from Lake Volta and the Akosombo Dam, a hydroelectric facility which supplies electricity to Ghana and an electricity exporter to neighboring countries of Ghana.

References

External links
 Ghana-pedia webpage - Atimpoku

Populated places in the Eastern Region (Ghana)